The year 719 BC was a year of the pre-Julian Roman calendar. In the Roman Empire, it was known as year 35 Ab urbe condita . The denomination 719 BC for this year has been used since the early medieval period, when the Anno Domini calendar era became the prevalent method in Europe for naming years.

Events
Zhou Huan Wang of the Zhou dynasty becomes ruler of China.

Deaths

References

710s BC